Inside Story may refer to:

Literature
 Inside Story (novel), a 2020 novel by Martin Amis

Music
 Inside Story (Grace Jones album), 1986
 Inside Story (Lalaine album)
 Inside Story (Prince Lasha album)
 The Inside Story (album), a 1979 album by Robben Ford
 "Inside Story", a 1988 song by Little River Band from the album Monsoon

Film
 Inside Story (film), a 1939 American film
 The Inside Story (film), 1948 American film

Television
 Inside Story (Australian TV program)
 Inside Story (TV programme), on Al Jazeera English and Al Jazeera America
 Inside Story (British documentary series), on BBC Two
 The Inside Story (Philippine TV series)
 "The Inside Story" (Rugrats)